Brian McReynolds (born January 5, 1965, in Penetanguishene, Ontario) is a former professional ice hockey player who played in the National Hockey League (NHL) for the Winnipeg Jets, New York Rangers, and Los Angeles Kings.

Career statistics

Regular season and playoffs

References

External links

1965 births
Atlanta Knights players
Binghamton Rangers players
Canadian expatriate ice hockey players in Sweden
Canadian ice hockey centres
Ice hockey people from Ontario
Kölner Haie players
Living people
Los Angeles Kings players
Malmö Redhawks players
Michigan State Spartans men's ice hockey players
Moncton Hawks players
NCAA men's ice hockey national champions
New York Rangers draft picks
New York Rangers players
People from Penetanguishene
Phoenix Roadrunners (IHL) players
Starbulls Rosenheim players
Winnipeg Jets (1979–1996) players